Renato "Rene" Luna Cayetano (December 12, 1934 – June 25, 2003), commonly known as Compañero, was a Filipino lawyer, television presenter, journalist, and politician. He served in the Regular Batasang Pambansa, representing the lone district of the Metro Manila municipalities of Taguig, Pateros and Muntinlupa, from 1984 until its abolition in 1986. He then served as a Senator from 1998 to 2003. He also hosted the television program Compañero y Compañera from 1997 to 2001.

He was the father of politicians Pia, Alan Peter, and Lino Cayetano.

Early life
Cayetano was born Renato Luna Cayetano on December 12, 1934, in San Carlos, Pangasinan, Philippines. He was the eldest son of mechanic Pedro Santiago Cayetano of Marilao, Bulacan and public school teacher Julianna Cabrera of Pateros, Rizal.

He graduated from Pateros Elementary School and Rizal High School. He earned his bachelor's degree at the University of the Philippines Diliman and three graduate degrees - Master of Public Administration, Master of Laws, and Doctor of Laws at the University of Michigan in Ann Arbor, Michigan.

Lawyer
Rene Cayetano was a founding partner of the Cayetano, Sebastian, Dado and Cruz Law Office, chairman of the House of Delegates and governor of the Integrated Bar of the Philippines, and, with Juan Ponce Enrile, co-founder of the Pecabar (Ponce Enrile Cayetano Bautista & Reyes) Law Offices.

Cayetano was active in private law practice, handling many sensational cases pro bono. He acted as private prosecutor in the Pepsi Paloma rape case, Manila Filmfest Scandal on behalf of Mayor Alfredo Lim, co-defense counsel for Luis Beltran in the libel case filed against him by former President Corazon Aquino. Most famous of these cases was the Vizconde case where all the accused were found guilty and sentenced to life imprisonment.

To reach a wider audience, he hosted Compañero y Compañera, a popular public service program that offers free legal advice to television viewers and radio listeners.

Public service
In 1998, former President Fidel V. Ramos conferred on Cayetano the Legion of Honor; and the Philippine Jaycees chose him as TOYM finalist in the field of law. Earlier, the Order of the Purple Feather of the UP College of Law adopted him as member and the Philippine Jaycees named him as outstanding Jaycees president. The University of Michigan and Princeton University in United States gave him various grants. He also received a doctorate in humanities, honoris causa, by Misamis University in 1997.

After his 1984 election as an assemblyman to the Regular Batasang Pambansa, he was appointed Deputy Minister for Trade and Industry Administrator of the Export Processing Zone Authority (now Philippine Export Zone Authority).

In 1995, he was appointed chief presidential counsel by Former President Ramos. In recognition of his efforts in crime prevention and improvement of the criminal justice system, he was named Vice Chairman of the Presidential Anti-Crime Commission (PACC).

Legislator
In May 1998, Cayetano was elected senator, garnering the second highest number of votes. The freshman senator became the Chairman of the Committee on Justice and Human Rights and Vice-Chairman of the Committee on Public Order and Illegal Drugs. He is also the Minority Leader of the Commission on Appointments and was a member of the Judicial Bar Council and BIR Oversight Committee. Before the 11th Congress adjourned February 9, he became the Senate Minority Leader Floor Leader, making him an ex-officio member of all Senate committees.

In his first term as a lawmaker, Senator Cayetano has filed a number of Senate bills and resolutions aimed at speeding up the dispensation of justice for criminal cases and in curbing graft and corruption. Through his efforts, the Supreme Court issued Administrative Order 51-96 designating special criminal courts in Metro Manila and other cities to hear cases involving heinous crimes and finish the trial within 60 days. A strong exponent of the rights of the consuming public, he filed Resolution No. 579 and fought for the ban on collection of parking fees by shopping malls. The Senate Committee on Commerce and Industry jointly with the Justice and Human Rights Committee found the collection of parking fees, and the provisions of the waiver of liability, stated in parking tickets are illegal.

He authored and co-authored landmark pieces of legislation during the 11th Congress which includes RA 8972 –"An Act to Facilitate the Acquisition of Right-of-Way, Site or Location for National Government Infrastructure Projects and for Other Purposes"; RA 8975 – An act to Ensure the Expeditious Implementation and Completion of Government Infrastructure Projects by prohibiting Lower Courts from Issuing a Temporary Restraining Orders, Preliminary Injunctions or Preliminary Mandatory Injunctions", RA 8799 – The Securities Regulation Code; RA 8749 "An Act providing for a Comprehensive Air Pollution Control Policy, and For Other Purposes (Clean Air Act); RA 8792 – "An Act Providing for and Electronic Commerce Law and for Other Purposes (E-Commerce Law) RA 9139 – "Administrative Naturalization Law of 2000"; RA 9136 – Electronic Power Industry Reform Act of 2201" and RA 9006 – The Fair Elections Act.

He was also responsible for Republic Act 9048 aimed at correcting clerical and typographical errors in an entry in personal legal documents as the city or municipality civil register level.

During the impeachment trial of former President Estrada, he was one of the ten Senator-Judges who voted for the opening of the second envelope, an event that triggered People Power II, which eventually led to the ousting of the former president.

He is the Chair of the Senate Committee on Education, Arts and Culture, and the Senate Committee on Energy for the 12th Congress.

Death
Cayetano peacefully died from the complications of abdominal cancer and liver cancer on June 25, 2003, at his home in Ayala Alabang, Muntinlupa. He is buried at the Garden of Memories Memorial Park in his hometown of Pateros. In 2005, the school "Senator Renato "Companero" Cayetano Memorial Science and Technology High School" was built in memory of him.

Legacy
Rene L. Cayetano Memorial School - Brgy. Maligaya, Mariveles, Bataan 
Rene L. Cayetano Memorial School
Rene Cayetano Elementary School - Patay Rd, Caloocan
Rene Cayetano Elementary School (Gabriela Silang Elementary School Annex I) - Phase 8-B, Pkg. 5, Caloocan
Compañero Rene Cayetano Foundation, Inc. - NDC Bldg, 116 Tordesillas, Makati
Senator Renato "Compañero" Cayetano Memorial Science and Technology High School - Taguig City

Personal life
Rene Cayetano was married to Sandra Schramm of Ann Arbor, Michigan, US. They had four children:
 Pilar Juliana (born March 22, 1966), with four children: Gabriel (passed away on 2001), Lucas, Maxine, Nadine
 Alan Peter (born October 28, 1970), married to Ma. Laarni Lopez
 Rene Carl (born July 31, 1973), married with 2 children 
 Lino Edgardo (born January 4, 1978), married to Fille Cainglet, with three children

Website
Former Senator Rene Cayetano's official site from the Senate

See also
 List of Philippine legislators who died in office

References

1934 births
2003 deaths
20th-century Filipino lawyers
Filipino television presenters
Rene
People from Pangasinan
People from Pateros
People from Taguig
Politicians from Metro Manila
Senators of the 12th Congress of the Philippines
Senators of the 11th Congress of the Philippines
Members of the House of Representatives of the Philippines from Metro Manila
Deaths from liver cancer
Deaths from cancer in the Philippines
Lakas–CMD (1991) politicians
University of Michigan Law School alumni
University of the Philippines Diliman alumni
Members of the Batasang Pambansa